Afroedura marleyi, also known as Marley's rock gecko or Marley's flat gecko, is a species of African gecko found in South Africa and Eswatini.

References

marleyi
Reptiles of Eswatini
Reptiles of South Africa
Taxa named by Vivian Frederick Maynard FitzSimons
Reptiles described in 1930